The 1978–79 Washington State Cougars men's basketball team represented Washington State University for the 1978–79 NCAA Division I men's basketball season. Led by seventh-year head coach George Raveling, the Cougars were members of the Pacific-10 Conference and played their home games on campus at the Performing Arts Coliseum in Pullman, Washington.

A late season loss at Arizona likely kept them out of the NIT.

References

External links
Sports Reference – Washington State Cougars: 1978–79 basketball season

Washington State Cougars men's basketball seasons
Washington State Cougars
Washington State
Washington State